Coconinoite is a uranium ore that was discovered in Coconino County, Arizona. It is a phosphate mineral; or uranyl phosphate mineral along with other subclass uranium U6+ minerals like blatonite, boltwoodite, metazeunerite and rutherfordine.

Composition
The chemical formula is Fe2Al2(UO2)2(PO4)4(SO4)(OH)2·20H2O.
The chemical formula was derived from the spectrographic analysis.

Physical properties
The mineral has a white streak and a pale creamy yellow color. The mineral occurs as microscopic crystals, the largest found is 6 by 20 micrometers. It is a radioactive mineral, but not fluorescent. Upon heating for dehydration it is found that the mineral loses some of its SO2 at 600 to 800 °C.

Geologic occurrence

It occurs in the oxidized zone of vanadium-poor Colorado Plateau-type uranium deposits of Utah and Arizona. It occurs in association with gypsum, jarosite, limonite, quartz, clay minerals and coalized wood at the Jomac mine,
Utah.

Coconinite was first described in 1966 for occurrences in the Huskon Mines, Cameron, Cameron District and the Sun Valley Mine, Vermillion Cliffs District, Coconino County, Arizona. It was named for Coconino County.

References

Iron(III) minerals
Aluminium minerals
Uranium(VI) minerals
Phosphate minerals
Monoclinic minerals
Minerals in space group 15